Koodum Thedi is a 1985 Malayalam-language romantic drama film produced by Siyad Koker under the banner of Kokers Films, directed by Paul Babu and written by S. N. Swamy. It stars Mohanlal and Radhika in lead roles, along with Rahman, Nadia Moidu, M. G. Soman, Thilakan, Sankaradi in supporting roles. The film features original songs composed by Jerry Amaldev, with lyrics written by M. D. Rajendran. The cinematography was done by P. C. Sreeram.

Plot
Peter (Mohanlal) is a fun loving person and his younger brother (Rahman) is college going youth. Things go head over heels for Peter as he falls in love with Devi (Radhika), a person who he is related to. But her brother (Soman) plans for her to marry Jayakumar (Sreenath), who is a friend of Peter. Devi marries Jayakumar. One day, Jayakumar dies in an accident, but Devi plans to live her life as Jayakumar's widow without knowing Peter's love for her. Rest of the story, is how Peter tells Devi about his love and whether or not they marry.

Cast
 Mohanlal as Peter Mathew
 Radhika as Devi 
 Rahman as Rex Mathew
 Nadia Moidu as Judy
 Soman as Menon
 Thilakan
 Sreenath as Jayakumar
 Mala Aravindan as Vasuvettan
 Prathapachandran as Mathaikutty
 Bahadoor
 Jagathy Sreekumar
 Sankaradi
 Sukumari
 Bhagyalakshmi

Soundtrack 

The film score was composed by Johnson.

Release

The movie was released on 19 July 1985 at 14 screens in Kerala.

Reception
The movie received good reports and collections thus becoming the first solo blockbuster for Mohanlal.

References

External links 
 

1985 films
1980s Malayalam-language films
Films scored by Jerry Amaldev